is a JR West Geibi Line station located in Suga, Tōjō-chō, Shōbara, Hiroshima Prefecture, Japan. Tickets are available at the nearby Suga Post Office.

History
1935-12-20: Bingo-Yawata Station opens as a station of the Sanshin Line between Tōjō Station and Onuka Station
1987-04-01: Japan National Railways is privatized, and Bingo-Yawata Station becomes a JR West station

Station layout
Bingo-Yawata Station features two platforms which can handle two lines at once. Platform 1 handles trains bound for Bingo Ochiai Station and Niimi Station. Platform 2 is not used.

The Suga Area Post Office is located near the station, and passenger tickets may be purchased there.

Two Hiroshima prefectural highways are accessible from the station: 
Route 237 (Bingo Yawata Teishajō Route)
Route 450 (Utsubori Bingo Yawata Teishajō Route)

Connecting lines
All lines are JR West lines.
Geibi Line
Tōjō Station — Bingo-Yawata Station — Uchina Station

External links
 JR West

Geibi Line
Railway stations in Hiroshima Prefecture
Railway stations in Japan opened in 1935
Shōbara, Hiroshima